Fairfield is a surname. Notable people with the surname include:
 Don Fairfield, golfer
 Edmund Burke Fairfield
 John Fairfield (abolitionist)
 Letitia Fairfield
 Priscilla Fairfield Bok, astronomer
 William Fairfield (Massachusetts politician), American politician